Something Supernatural is the first studio album by American hard rock band, Crobot. The album was released via Wind-up Records on October 28, 2014.

Track listing 

Below is the track listing for the album:

Charting

Further reading
 "‘Something Supernatural’: Crobot Guitarist Chris Bishop Talks New Album and Gear by James Wood, Guitar World (October 1, 2014)
 "Something Supernatural by Crobot" by Erich Morse, National Rock Review (Dec 10, 2014)
 "Meet Crobot, the Band That Tattooed Their Times Square Caricatures on Each Other " by Katherine Turman, Village Voice (July 15, 2015)

References 

2014 debut albums
Crobot albums
Wind-up Records albums